Blackbush scrub, or blackbrush scrub, is a vegetation type of the Western United States deserts characterized by low growing, dark gray blackbush (Coleogyne ramosissima) as the dominant species. Blackbush often occurs in pure stands, giving a uniform dark gray appearance to the landscape.

Mojave Desert
Blackbrush scrub occurs over a wide elevation range in the Mojave Desert. It may occur as an understory in Joshua tree woodland or pinyon-juniper woodland. Associates in the Mojave Desert include ephedra (Ephedra nevadensis, Ephedra viridis), hop-sage Grayia spinosa, turpentine broom (Thamnosma montana), horsebrush (Tedradymia spp.), cheesebush (Ambrosia salsola), and winter fat (Krascheninnikovia lanata).

Colorado Plateau
In the Colorado Plateau, it occurs across uniformly thin soils.

References

Natural history of the Mojave Desert
Plant communities of California
Plant communities of the Western United States
Flora of the Colorado Plateau and Canyonlands region